Eugeniusz Kubicki (born Eryk Kubicki; 18 August 1925) is a Polish former footballer.

Career
Kubicki joined York City from the Polish Army in October 1946.

References

1925 births
Possibly living people
Association football wingers
Polish footballers
York City F.C. players
Sportspeople from Chorzów
Poland international footballers
Ruch Chorzów players